Magnus Ek (born 1994) is a Swedish politician. He served as Member of the Riksdag representing the constituency of Östergötland County. He was chairman of the Centre Party Youth from 2015 to 2019.

Personal life 

His mother Lena Ek is a former politician. She served as Minister for the Environment from 2011 to 2014.

References

External links 
 

Living people
1994 births
Place of birth missing (living people)
21st-century Swedish politicians
Members of the Riksdag 2018–2022
Members of the Riksdag from the Centre Party (Sweden)